Luke Edward Wright (August 29, 1846 – November 17, 1922) was a United States political figure. He served as Governor-General of the Philippines from 1904 to 1905 and also as Secretary of War from 1908 to 1909.

Biography
Luke Edward Wright was born in Giles County, Tennessee, and moved with his family to Memphis in 1850.  He attended the public schools, and enlisted at fifteen in the Confederate States Army with Company G of the 154th Senior Tennessee Infantry Regiment during the American Civil War.  In 1863, Wright was cited for bravery under fire in the Battle of Murfreesboro and promoted to second lieutenant.  After the Civil War, Wright attended the University of Mississippi from 1867 to 1868, but he did not graduate. He was a member of the Delta Psi fraternity, also known as St. Anthony Hall.

After studying law in his father's office, Wright was admitted to the bar and entered into practice in Memphis.  For eight years, he served as Tennessee Attorney General, and he was instrumental in establishing a relief committee during an epidemic of yellow fever in 1878. Before the nomination of William Jennings Bryan, Wright was a Democrat. In 1900, Wright was a member of the second Philippine Commission and was appointed vice-governor of the Philippines in 1901. Wright became full Governor-General of the Philippines in 1904 and continued in that office until 1905. From 1906 to 1907, Wright served as the first full United States Ambassador to Japan.

From July 1, 1908 to March 11, 1909, Wright served as United States Secretary of War under President Theodore Roosevelt. He stressed actions to eliminate unfit officers and sought to take advantage of aviation technology.  He served less than a year before resigning. He returned to private life and died on November 17, 1922, at his home in Memphis. He was buried at Forest Hill Cemetery in Memphis.

Legacy
The "Pool of Pines", better known as  Wright Park in Baguio, Philippines was named after Governor Luke E. Wright, the architect of this long, shallow reflecting pool. A street in Dumaguete in Negros Oriental province is named after him.

References

External links

 Wright Park, Baguio City Philippines

 

 

1846 births
1922 deaths
People from Giles County, Tennessee
Tennessee Attorneys General
United States Secretaries of War
Governors-General of the Philippine Islands
American expatriates in the Philippines
Ambassadors of the United States to Japan
Confederate States Army officers
People of Tennessee in the American Civil War
Theodore Roosevelt administration cabinet members
20th-century American politicians
American lawyers admitted to the practice of law by reading law
People from Memphis, Tennessee
20th-century American diplomats